A tigon, tiglon, or tion (portmanteau of tiger and lion) is the hybrid offspring of a male tiger (Panthera tigris) and a lioness (Panthera leo). They exhibit visible characteristics from both parents: they can have both spots from the mother (lions carry genes for spots – lion cubs are spotted and some adults retain faint markings) and stripes from the father. Any mane that a male tigon may have will appear shorter and less noticeable than a lion's mane and is closer in type to the ruff of a male tiger. 

Fertility
Guggisberg wrote that ligers and tigons were long thought to be sterile; in 1943, however, a 15-year-old hybrid between a lion and an "Island" tiger was successfully mated with a lion at the Munich Hellabrunn Zoo. The female cub was then raised to adulthood. Like the liger, male tigons are sterile while the females are fertile.

At the Alipore Zoo in India, a tigoness named Rudhrani, born in 1971, was successfully mated to a male Asiatic lion named Debabrata. The rare, second generation hybrid was called a litigon. Rudhrani produced seven litigons in her lifetime.

Reports also exist of the similar titigon , resulting from the cross between a female tigon and a male tiger. Titigons resemble golden tigers, but with less contrast in their markings. A tigoness born in 1978, named Noelle, shared an enclosure in the Shambala Preserve with a male Siberian tiger called Anton, due to the keepers' belief that she was sterile. In 1983 Noelle produced a titigon named Nathaniel. As Nathaniel was three-quarters tiger, he had darker stripes than Noelle and vocalized more like a tiger, rather than with the mix of sounds used by his mother. Being only about quarter-lion, Nathaniel did not grow a mane. Nathaniel died of cancer at the age of nine years old. Noelle also developed a severe cancer, that killed her not long after she was diagnosed.

Coexistence of parental species

As with the liger, the tigon is found only in captivity, because the habitats of the lion and tiger do not overlap. In the past, however, the Asiatic lion did coexist with the Bengal tiger in the wilderness of India, besides occurring in countries where the Caspian tiger had been, such as Iran and Turkey. In India, there is a plan to shift some lions from their current home of the Gir Forest to Kuno Wildlife Sanctuary, which has some tigers, but it has not been implemented as of December 2017, perhaps due to political reasons, as the Gujarat state government does not want any other state to have lions in the forests.

See also
Liger
Carl Hagenbeck
Felid hybrid
Leopon
Hybrid growth disorders
 Genomic imprinting
List of portmanteaus
Maltese tiger
Panthera hybrid

References

External links
Detailed Information of hybrid big cats.
Liger. snopes.com.
Questions about Animals. Gk12.iastate.edu.

Panthera hybrids